Code of the Silver Sage is a 1950 American Western film directed by Fred C. Brannon and starring Allan Lane.

Plot

Cast
Allan Lane as Lieutenant Rocky Lane
Eddy Waller as Nugget Clark
Roy Barcroft as Hulon Champion
Kay Christopher as Ann Gately
Lane Bradford as Henchman Watson
William Ruhl as Major Duncan
Richard Emory as Lieutenant John Case
Kenne Duncan as Henchman Dick Cantwell
Rex Lease as Captain Mathews
Hank Patterson as Sergeant Woods
John Butler as Charley Speed
Forrest Taylor as Rancher Sandy
Black Jack as Rocky's Horse

References

External links 
 

1950 films
American Western (genre) films
1950 Western (genre) films
Republic Pictures films
Films directed by Fred C. Brannon
Films adapted into comics
American black-and-white films
1950s English-language films
1950s American films